Oscar Han (December 3, 1891 in Bucharest – February 14, 1976 in Bucharest) was a Romanian sculptor and writer. 

A student of Dimitrie Paciurea at the Academy of Arts in Bucharest, he was a member of the Group of Four together with painters Nicolae Tonitza, Francisc Șirato and Ștefan Dimitrescu. Han is mainly known for his statues and busts of notable Romanians.  His works were exhibited mainly in Bucharest, but also at Romanian art exhibitions and international exhibitions in other European cities.

Works

External links

1891 births
1976 deaths
20th-century Romanian sculptors
Bucharest National University of Arts alumni
Artists from Bucharest